Lilia al-Atrash (born 18 August 1977) is Syrian television actress. She started her career with the famous actor and writer Yasser al-Azma in the sitcom Maraya.

References

Syrian television actresses
Living people
1977 births
Syrian Druze